FC Britannia XI is a futsal club from Gibraltar, which currently plays in the Gibraltar Futsal First Division, the second tier of futsal in Gibraltar. Until 2016, the club also operated an association football team who played in the Gibraltar Premier Division until its relegation and resignation at the end of the 2015–16 season. The club, like all others in the territory, play at the Victoria Stadium on Winston Churchill Avenue.

History

The club was previously known as Britannia FC and was previously one of the more dominant sides in Gibraltar, winning several championships in the 1950s, until going into administration and regrouping under its current name in 2009. In 2014 they secured promotion back to the Premier Division after winning the Second Division title. Their first season saw them avoid relegation due to the league's expansion. The club began their second season in the top-flight well under Alan Arruda, being third for the majority of the first half of the season. However, his resignation in early 2016, coupled with the departure of key players, saw them plummet down the league and finish in 9th, meaning they had to participate in a play-off to determine their fate. After losing their play-off to Mons Calpe, they resigned from the league.

Futsal

Britannia launched their futsal team in 2015, however, after resigning from the football league, the club remained inactive for a year. In 2017, the club relaunched its futsal team, and joined the Gibraltar Futsal Third Division. In 2018, they joined the new look First Division, after the leagues were rebranded and merged into two tiers, the Premier Division and the First Division.

Current futsal squad

Stadium 

Victoria Stadium is a multi-purpose stadium in Gibraltar. It is currently used mostly for football matches and holds about 5,000 people. It is located close to the Gibraltar Airport just off Winston Churchill Avenue. It was named after the wife of Gibraltarian philanthropist John Mackintosh.

Honours
Gibraltar Premier Division – 1907–08, 1911–12, 1912–13, 1917–18, 1919–20, 1936–37, 1940–41, 1954–55, 1955–56, 1956–57, 1957–58, 1958–59, 1960–61, 1962–63.
Gibraltar Second Division – 2013–14
Rock Cup – 1937, 1940, 1948.

Kit suppliers 

  Adidas (2012–2014)
  Joma (2014–2016)

See also 
 Football in Gibraltar
 Gibraltar Football Association
 List of football clubs in Gibraltar

External links 
 Official site of the Gibraltar Football Association

Football clubs in Gibraltar
Futsal clubs in Gibraltar
Futsal clubs established in 2015